Made in Heart, is a 2014 Burmese drama film starring Pyay Ti Oo, Moe Hay Ko and Wutt Hmone Shwe Yi. The film, produced by Lucky Seven Film Production, premiered in Myanmar on October 3, 2014.

Cast
 Zin Wine as U Thitsar
 Moe Hay Ko as Thitsar Ye Ye Ni (his daughter)
 Zin Myo as Moe Di (his son)
 Wutt Hmone Shwe Yi as Mee Mee Ye Ye Ni
 Pyay Ti Oo as Thiha

Awards

References

2014 films
2010s Burmese-language films
Burmese drama films
Films shot in Myanmar
Films directed by Wyne